François Affolter (born 13 March 1991) is a Swiss professional footballer who plays as a defender for Biel-Bienne in the Swiss Promotion League.  He was part of the Swiss team at the 2012 Summer Olympics.

Career

Young Boys
Born in Biel/Bienne, Bern, He made his senior debut for BSC Young Boys at the age of 17 years on 14 September 2008 in a 2–1 victory over AC Bellinzona, replacing Marc Schneider in the starting eleven due to suspension. Since that match, he was a regular starter for the club in their three-man defence, alongside Saif Ghezal and Miguel Alfredo Portillo.

Before he played with the first team, he played with the under 18 team. They won the under 18 championship the same year. Then, he joined the first team for friendly matches in the summer of 2008 and the new Young Boys coach Vladimir Petkovic gave him his chance.

He signed his first professional contract with Young Boys in November 2008. After three seasons with Young Boys, he was loaned to German club Werder Bremen.

After an unsuccessful half year at Young Boys, he decided to transfer to Swiss side FC Luzern for an undisclosed fee. His contract was set to expire in June 2018.

San Jose Earthquakes
On 21 July 2017, Major League Soccer side San Jose Earthquakes announced it had signed Affolter to a multi-year contract on a free transfer from Luzern. He made his first appearance for San Jose on 9 August, starting in the U.S. Open Cup semifinal against Sporting Kansas City and substituting out during extra time in the 103rd minute. He made his first MLS start and appearance on 12 August in a 3–0 loss to the Houston Dynamo at BBVA Compass Stadium.

FC Aarau
In February 2020, Affolter joined Swiss Challenge League side FC Aarau until the end of the 2019–20 season.

Chiasso
In September 2020, free agent Affolter signed with FC Chiasso, also of the Swiss Challenge League.

Return to Biel-Bienne
On 29 December 2021, Affolter returned to his youth club Biel-Bienne on a 2.5-year contract.

Personal life
Affolter received his U.S. green card in July 2018, which qualifies him as a domestic player for MLS roster purposes.

Career statistics

Club

References

1991 births
People from Biel/Bienne
Sportspeople from the canton of Bern
Living people
Association football defenders
Swiss men's footballers
Switzerland youth international footballers
Switzerland under-21 international footballers
Switzerland international footballers
FC Biel-Bienne players
BSC Young Boys players
SV Werder Bremen players
SV Werder Bremen II players
FC Luzern players
San Jose Earthquakes players
FC Aarau players
FC Chiasso players
Swiss Super League players
Bundesliga players
Major League Soccer players
Swiss Challenge League players
Footballers at the 2012 Summer Olympics
Olympic footballers of Switzerland
Swiss expatriate footballers
Expatriate footballers in Germany
Swiss expatriate sportspeople in Germany
Expatriate soccer players in the United States
Swiss expatriate sportspeople in the United States